Smooter may refer to:

Smooter family, fictional characters in Sweet Home Alabama (film)
JB Smooter, fictional character in Perfect Harmony (musical)

See also
Scooter (nickname)